Dries De Pooter (born 8 November 2002) is a Belgian racing cyclist, who currently rides for UCI WorldTeam .

Major results

2019
 5th Overall Vuelta Ribera del Duero
2020
 1st  Road race, National Junior Road Championships
2021
 4th Road race, National Under-23 Road Championships
 7th Omloop der Kempen
 7th Ster van Zwolle
2022
 1st Stage 1 Flanders Tomorrow Tour
 8th Trofej Umag
 10th Liège–Bastogne–Liège Espoirs

References

External links

2002 births
Living people
Belgian male cyclists
People from Geel